Altrincham is a market town in Greater Manchester, England. 

Altrincham may also refer to:
Altrincham (UK Parliament constituency), a county constituency of the House of Commons of the UK Parliament from 1885 to 1945
Altrincham (ward), an electoral ward of Trafford
Altrincham F.C., a football club
Altrincham (rugby league), a former rugby league club
Baron Altrincham, a title in the British peerage